The Judo event at the 2013 European Youth Summer Olympic Festival was an edition of the judo competitions in the European Youth Olympic Festival. It was held in Utrecht, Netherlands from 13 to 20 July 2013.

Medal summary

Medal table

Men's events

Women's events

Source Results

References

External links
 

2013 European Youth Summer Olympic Festival
2013
European Championships, U16
2013 European Youth Summer Olympic Festival
Judo
Judo, European Championships U16